Shirley Abicair (born 26 October 1930) is an Australian-born singer, musician, television personality, actress and author. In the 1950s and 60s, she was probably best known as an exponent of the zither.

Early life
Shirley Abicair was born in Melbourne, Victoria, Australia. Some sources show her year of birth as 1935, but a contemporary account shows she was 23 or 24 on arrival in the UK and, as she had completed tertiary studies in Australia, the earlier date seems more likely. She was the only daughter of a Wing Commander in the RAAF.

Education
Abicair resided in Adelaide prior to pursuing studies at the Sydney Conservatorium of Music and/or Sydney University (as with her year of birth, accounts differ), where she studied philosophy, languages and the arts. She sang in under-graduate revues.

Career
While studying in Sydney, Abicair began singing at parties and private functions to support her studies, accompanying herself on the zither. Self-taught, she is said to have found the zither whilst rummaging in a cupboard as a small child. She then entered and won a Sydney radio talent quest. This led to offers of engagements on radio and in theatre and cabaret. Abicair, a typist, became popular in Sydney in the late 1940s.

Around 1952, Abicair left Sydney for London. She was photographed by a newspaper photographer looking for pretty faces while disembarking at London Airport. Her photo was spotted by a radio producer in the newspaper and within weeks this led to her appearing on BBC Television. Not much later that year she had her own programme in which she sang and played the zither. In December, she also appeared in the title role of the pantomime Cinderella with George Martin, the Casual Comedian, at the Empress Theatre in Brixton. The zither was, along with her Australian-ness, to become her trademark. She released her first record "Careless Love" that year.  In 1953 the Empire theatre in Nottingham billed her as "TV's zither girl". In this period, she co-starred with comedian Norman Wisdom in the film One Good Turn (1955).

In 1956, Abicair recorded (produced by George Martin, later known for his work with the Beatles) the title song for the soundtrack of the Australian film Smiley. On 26 March 1956, Abicair appeared on BBC TV Off The Record. Through the middle/late 1950s she hosted (with help from her puppet friends, Australian indigenous children, Tea Cup and Clothespeg), a series called Children's Hour, a children's TV show. In the process, she became an unofficial ambassador and promoter of Australia to a generation of British children. This Australian image was reinforced by her release of records with titles such as "(I Love You) Fair Dinkum" and "Botany Bay". Her rendering of the Australian folk song  Little Boy Fishing off a Wooden Pier, released in 1956, become a regular on the BBCs Children's Favourites request program. 

In 1959 she returned to Australia briefly to record a series of television documentary films she had conceived, based on Australian folk songs, entitled Shirley Abicair in Australia, for the Australian ABC TV network.
Abicair accepted a request to perform at The Variety Club of Great Britain eighth annual Star Gala at the Festival Gardens, Battersea Park, London, Saturday 13 May 1961. In 1962, she toured the Soviet Union, and in the same year, she gave a recital at the Festival Hall in London. Later that year in October she visited the United States for performances. It was in 1962 as well that her children's book, Tales of Tumbarumba was published. 

In June 1963, in the US, she appeared with the Smothers Brothers on Hootenanny and the panel game show To Tell the Truth, with Cicely Tyson on 25 March 1963. In December, for ABC Australia, she appeared on Comedy Bandbox.

In 1965, Abicair's EP, "On the Nursery Beat", was released. It was a number of nursery rhymes put to a Mersey beat. This tour was filmed and later released as a TV special "East of Howerd". During 1966–67 she released a number of more mature songs on record including her version of the Gerry Goffin–Carole King song "So Goes Love'" and Paul Simon's "Flowers Never Bend with the Rainfall". She had previously, in the early 1960s, released three albums of folk songs.

Abicair joined up with harmonica player Larry Adler in 1968 to do a children's theatre show. She began her own one-woman theatre show in 1969 at the Arts Theatre in London.

In 1971, Abicair moved to Oregon in the United States, where she appeared in a series of college concerts with the American writer Ken Kesey. Abicair currently (2002–2007) lives in London and divides her time between Britain, the US and Australia.

See also
Murray Sayle
Gay Kindersley

Bibliography
Australian Encyclopedia – Sixth Edition – 1996 – Vol. 1 – Pub: Australian Geographic Society – 
Sleeve Notes from LP – "Shirley Abicair Sings Songs From Many Lands" – 1960
 Tales of Tumbarumba London; Max Parrish, 1962 Illustrated by Margaret Cilento

References

External links

1930 births
Living people
Year of birth uncertain
Actresses from Melbourne
Australian emigrants to the United States
Australian expatriates in the United Kingdom
Australian women singers
Singers from Melbourne
Sydney Conservatorium of Music alumni
Traditional pop music singers
Writers from Melbourne
Zither players